Amphechinus is an extinct genus of hedgehog of the family Erinaceidae, which lived in Asia and Europe during the Oligocene and in North America, Africa, Asia and Europe during the Miocene.

Taxonomy
Amphechinus was named by Auguste Aymard in 1850. It is not extant. It was assigned to Erinaceidae by Aymard (1850), Rich (1981) and Pickford et al. (2000).

Morphology

Its fossils have been found in Africa, Asia, Europe and North America.

Species
A. akespensis, A. arvernensis, A. baudelotae, A. edwardsi, A. ginsburgi, A. golpeae, A. horncloudi, A. intermedius, A. kreuzae, A. major, A. microdus, A. minutissimus, A. robinsoni, A. taatsiingolensis.

Sources 

 The Beginning of the Age of Mammals by Kenneth D. Rose

External links
Amphechinus in the Paleobiology Database

Hedgehogs
Tortonian genus extinctions
Miocene mammals of Africa
Oligocene mammals of Asia
Miocene mammals of Asia
Oligocene mammals of Europe
Miocene mammals of Europe
Miocene mammals of North America
Prehistoric placental genera
Oligocene genus first appearances
Fossil taxa described in 1850